Roggel en Neer is a former municipality in the Dutch province of Limburg. It covered the villages of Roggel, Neer, and Heibloem. Since January 1, 2007, the area has been a part of the new municipality of Leudal.

Roggel en Neer is the renaming of the municipality of Roggel in 1993.

Municipalities of the Netherlands established in 1993
Municipalities of the Netherlands disestablished in 2007
Former municipalities of Limburg (Netherlands)
Leudal